The Londoner was a newsletter in the style of a newspaper published by the Mayor of London, and delivered free to most households in Greater London, United Kingdom.

In the words of the Mayor of London's office, it was "a newsletter for Londoners from the Mayor of London. It provided information about the policies and services delivered by the Greater London Authority, and key issues affecting life in the capital, and encouraged participation in current debates and consultation."

According to the Mayor's Annual Report 2005/06, the budget for The Londoner was £2,882,000, of which £632,000 came directly from the GLA precept portion of council tax paid by householders in London. Most of the remaining £2,250,000 came from advertising and editorial material, paid for by Transport for London and the Metropolitan Police Authority.

Criticism
Costing £2.8 million a year to fund, many stated that the publication was "expensive propaganda". It became the topic of many heated blog articles, particularly those who criticised mayor Ken Livingstone. 

Those targeting the Londoner attacked what they saw as political bias; for example, putting the Flag of Venezuela on an advertisement for bus travel. The succeeding Mayor Boris Johnson scrapped The Londoner by May 2008, as part of his mayoral manifesto pledge, describing it as "the Mayor's ludicrous Pyongyang style newspaper". Johnson pledged to use up to £1 million of the saved money to plant 10,000 trees.

References

External links
The Londoner Official Website - archive from web.archive.org
BBC Politics Show article about The Londoner

Local mass media in London
Local government in London
Publications disestablished in 2008